CTGF, also known as CCN2 or connective tissue growth factor, is a matricellular protein of the CCN family of extracellular matrix-associated heparin-binding proteins (see also CCN intercellular signaling protein). CTGF has important roles in many biological processes, including cell adhesion, migration, proliferation, angiogenesis, skeletal development, and tissue wound repair, and is critically involved in fibrotic disease and several forms of cancers.

Structure and binding partners 

Members of the CCN protein family, including CTGF, are structurally characterized by having four conserved, cysteine-rich domains. These domains are, from N- to C-termini, the insulin-like growth factor binding protein (IGFBP) domain, the von Willebrand type C repeats (vWC) domain, the thrombospondin type 1 repeat (TSR) domain, and a C-terminal domain (CT) with a cysteine knot motif. CTGF exerts its functions by binding to various cell surface receptors in a context-dependent manner, including integrin receptors, cell surface  heparan sulfate proteoglycans (HSPGs), LRPs, and TrkA. In addition, CTGF also binds growth factors and extracellular matrix proteins. The N-terminal half of CTGF interacts with aggrecan, the TSR domain interacts with VEGF, and the CT domain interacts with members of the TGF-β superfamily, fibronectin, perlecan, fibulin-1, slit, and mucins.

Role in development 

Knockout mice with the Ctgf gene disrupted die at birth due to respiratory stress as a result of severe chondrodysplasia. Ctgf-null mice also show defects in angiogenesis, with impaired interaction between endothelial cells and pericytes and collagen IV deficiency in the endothelial basement membrane. CTGF is also important for pancreatic beta cell development, and is critical for normal ovarian follicle development and ovulation.

Clinical significance 

CTGF is associated with wound healing and virtually all fibrotic pathology. It is thought that CTGF can cooperate with TGF-β to induce sustained fibrosis and to exacerbate extracellular matrix production in association other fibrosis-inducing conditions. Overexpression of CTGF in fibroblasts promotes fibrosis in the dermis, kidney, and lung, and deletion of Ctgf in fibroblasts and smooth muscle cells greatly reduces bleomycin-induced skin fibrosis.

In addition to fibrosis, aberrant CTGF expression is also associated with many types of malignancies, diabetic nephropathy and retinopathy, arthritis, and cardiovascular diseases. Several clinical trials are now ongoing that investigate the therapeutic value of targeting CTGF in fibrosis, diabetic nephropathy, and pancreatic cancer.

CTGF (CCN2) has recently been implicated in mood disorders, notably in the postpartum period; these effects may be mediated by its effects on myelination

See also
Ctgf/hcs24 CAESAR
CYR61 (CCN1)

References

External links
 

Growth factors
CCN proteins